Anilios ganei, also known as Gane's blind snake, is a species of blind snake that is endemic to Australia. The specific epithet ganei honours schoolteacher and amateur herpetologist Lori Gane who collected the first known specimen in 1991.

Description
The species grows to about 30 cm in length. The upper body is a deep grey-brown, the belly cream.

Behaviour
The species is oviparous.

Distribution
The snake is found in the Pilbara region of north-western Western Australia. The type locality is Cathedral Gorge, 30 km west of Newman.

References

 
ganei
Snakes of Australia
Reptiles of Western Australia
Reptiles described in 1998